The 2022–23 Missouri Valley Conference men's basketball season began with practices in October 2022, followed by the start of the 2022–23 NCAA Division I men's basketball season in November. Conference play began in December and will end in February.

The season will be the first with 12 teams in the conference with Belmont, Murray State, and UIC joining the conference. Loyola Chicago left the conference following the prior season to join the Atlantic 10 Conference.

Preseason

Preseason poll 
The preseason awards and coaches' poll was released by the league office on October 18, 2022.

Preseason All-Missouri Valley teams

Source

References

2022–23 Missouri Valley Conference men's basketball season